Macrobrochis volzi is a moth of the subfamily Arctiinae. It was described by Weymer in 1909. It is found on Sumatra in Indonesia.

References

Lithosiina
Moths described in 1909